Villa Rica is a town and municipality in the Cauca Department, Colombia. The municipality has a Baháʼí House of Worship in the vereda Agua Azul.

References

Municipalities of Cauca Department